Yang Hucheng (26 November 1893 – 6 September 1949) was a Chinese general during the Warlord Era of Republican China and Kuomintang general during the Chinese Civil War.

Yang Hucheng joined the Xinhai Revolution in his youth and had become a popular warlord of Shaanxi Province by 1926. Following the defeat of Feng Yuxiang and Yan Xishan in the Central Plains War of 1930, Yang allied himself with the Kuomintang's Republic of China government (Nanjing Nationalist government) becoming commander of the Kuomintang's Northwest Army. Ordered to destroy the newly established Communist Party of China (CPC) stronghold at Yan'an with Zhang Xueliang's Northeast Army in 1935, both Yang and Zhang Xueliang were impressed with the Communists' determined defense and fighting capabilities.  They were also convinced by the Communist proposal for a united Chinese defense against the Japanese invasion of China (later Second United Front).

As both sides ceased hostilities, Kuomintang chairman Chiang Kai-shek flew to Xi'an in early December to investigate the inaction. In the following Xi'an Incident, once Chiang refused the Communist proposal to join forces against the Japanese, Yang and Zhang Xueliang had Chiang Kai-shek arrested and held him captive until he agreed to an alliance between the Kuomintang and Communists. Flying back to the Kuomintang capital at Nanjing with Chiang Kai-shek, Zhang Xueliang was arrested upon their arrival.  Yang was also secretly arrested later and he would remain in prison for over thirteen years until Chiang Kai-shek ordered him executed in September 1949, along with his wife and children and some of his officers, shortly before the Communist capture of Nanjing near the end of the Chinese Civil War. The Martyrs Cemetery of General Yang Hucheng is in Chang'an District, Xi'an. Some of his other family members joined the CPC.

References

Dupuy, Trevor N. Harper Encyclopedia of Military Biography, New York: HarperCollins Publishers Inc., 1992.

1893 births
1949 deaths
Republic of China warlords from Shaanxi
National Revolutionary Army generals from Shaanxi
People executed by the Republic of China
Executed Republic of China people
Politicians from Weinan
People executed by stabbing
20th-century executions by China
Executed people from Shaanxi